Le finte bionde is a 1989 Italian comedy film directed by Carlo Vanzina.

Cast
Cinzia Leone as Graziella
Cinzia Bonfantini as Sandra
Alessandra Casella as Francesca
Bruna Feirri as Patrizia
Paola Quattrini as Giovanna
Francesca Reggiani as Turchese
Emanuela Rossi as Elena 
Lucia Stara as Mara
Sergio Vastano as Luigi
Guido Nicheli as Roberto
Massimo Wertmüller as Giovanni
Isaac George as Garcia
Vincenzo Crocitti as Felice
Maurizio Mattioli as Egidio
Antonello Fassari as Carlo
Pino Insegno as "Raging Dull"
Licia Colò as "Ordinary People" wife
Claudio Fattoretto as "Ordinary People" husband
Oreste Lionello as the narrator

References

External links

1989 films
Films directed by Carlo Vanzina
1980s Italian-language films
1989 comedy films
Italian comedy films
1980s Italian films